Adrienne Eadie Adams (born December 9, 1960) is an American politician serving as Speaker of the New York City Council. A Democrat, Adams represents the 28th district, and is the first woman elected to the district.

Adams was elected in 2017 to fill out the remainder of the term of her expelled predecessor, Ruben Wills. 

Her district includes the Queens borough neighborhoods of Jamaica, Rochdale Village, Richmond Hill and South Ozone Park.

Early life and education 
Adams was raised in Hollis, Queens. She attended St. Pascal Baylon Elementary School, Bayside High School (Queens), and received a bachelor's degree in Psychology from Spelman College.

Career 
She was a three-term chairperson of Queens Community Board 12. Previously, Adams has been an appointed member of the Queens Public Library Board of Trustees, and appointed to Governor Andrew Cuomo’s Local Planning Committee (LPC) for the Jamaica Downtown Revitalization Initiative. She once served as co-chair of the Jamaica NOW Leadership Council.

Adams previously ran for New York State Senate against James Sanders Jr.

New York City Council 
Adams won her 2017 primary with 39.17% of the vote (3,499 votes). Her opponent, Richard David, got 31.59% of the vote (2,822 votes) and her other opponent Hettie Powell received 28.98% of the vote. (2,589 votes). Adams went on to win the general election with 85.97% of the vote. During her first term she was elected by her colleagues in the Black, Latino and Asian Caucus to serve as co-chair of the body, and at various points also served as chair of the Subcommittee on Landmarks, Public Sitings, and Dispositions, and later chair of the Committee on Public Safety.

Adams was elected Speaker of the New York City Council in January 2022.  She is the second politician from the borough of Queens to serve as Speaker (Peter Vallone Sr. was the first City Council Speaker of New York City).  She is the third woman to serve as Speaker and the first Black person to serve as Speaker. Her election was a defeat for newly elected mayor Eric Adams (no relation), who had privately been trying to win support for rival Speaker candidate Francisco Moya.

Personal life 
Adams is a long time member of the NAACP and the National Action Network. She is also an active member of the Alpha Kappa Alpha sorority.

References

External links 
Council Member Adrienne Adams official site

|-

|-

Living people
Speakers of the New York City Council
New York (state) Democrats
New York City Council members
21st-century American politicians
21st-century American women politicians
People from Hollis, Queens
Bayside High School (Queens) alumni
Spelman College alumni
Women New York City Council members
Politicians from Queens, New York
1960 births